Logau-Las is a hamlet in the  community of Ysbyty Ystwyth, Ceredigion, Wales, which is 65.4 miles (105.2 km) from Cardiff and 168.3 miles (270.8 km) from London. Logau-Las is represented in the Senedd by Elin Jones (Plaid Cymru) and is part of the Ceredigion constituency in the House of Commons.

See also
 Metal mining in Wales - a nearby lead and silver mine
 List of localities in Wales by population

References

Villages in Ceredigion